Guymon Patrick Casady (born 12 March 1969) is an American media executive, motion picture and television producer and talent manager.

Casady is a four time Emmy Award-winning and originating co-executive producer on HBO's Game of Thrones, which holds the distinction for being the most Emmy award-winning scripted series in television history. 

He is the producer of such populist and critically acclaimed movies as Steve Jobs written by Aaron Sorkin, directed by Danny Boyle, starring Michael Fassbender and Kate Winslet, which was nominated for two Oscars; Hope Springs starring Meryl Streep, Tommy Lee Jones and Steve Carell, which was nominated for a Golden Globe; Office Christmas Party starring Jason Bateman, Jennifer Aniston and Kate McKinnon; Patricia Highsmith's Deep Water, directed by Adrian Lyne, and starring Ben Affleck and Ana de Armas; Halle Berry’s directorial debut, Bruised, in which she starred; He is an executive producer on the $800M grossing franchise The Expendables.  Next up for Casady is The Fall Guy, directed by David Leitch, and starring Ryan Gosling and Emily Blunt, to be released March 1, 2024.

In television, Casady is an originating and executive producer on the critically acclaimed television series The Terror and the upcoming Talented Mr. Ripley, written and directed by Oscar winner Steve Zaillian.  

Casady is a founding partner of Entertainment 360, a leading entertainment firm in Los Angeles, California.

Education

He earned a B.A. in European history and art history from the University of Pennsylvania. He began his career in artist management working at Creative Artists Agency (CAA).

Career

He began his career in Hollywood as an assistant in the Motion Picture Talent Department at Creative Arts Agency.  He left CAA to work for Propaganda Films CEO Steve Golin.  While working as Steve’s assistant, Casady wrote a business plan making the argument for why Propaganda should start a talent management company in house to theatrically represent the directors who they were already representing for music videos and commercials, including David Fincher, Michael Bay, Spike Jonze, Antoine Fuqua, etc.  He was then promoted to work as a movie executive and worked on such movies as The Game and Being John Malcovich.  When Phillips sold Polygram (who owned Propaganda) to Seagrams, Casady left Propaganda to work as a manager for Industry Entertainment. On November 13, 2002, some employees, including Casady, left Industry Entertainment to begin a new venture, named Management 360, a start up talent management production company he cofounded with Suzan Bymel, Evelyn O’Neill, Daniel Rappaport, Eric Kranzler and David Seltzer. Shortly after forming Management 360, on July 7, 2003, the company had signed a deal with Warner Bros. Pictures.

From 2011 - 2017, Casady produced MPTF’s annual Reel Stories, Real Lives evening to raise money and build next generation awareness for the organization.

In 2008, Casady was included in Variety’s first annual Dealmakers Impact Report.

Personal life
Casady is a U.S. Junior National rowing champion in the 4 with coxswain. He is the son of Janed and Kent Casady. He is married to Robyn Norris Casady, and is the father of Ford and Boone Casady. His late grandfather was the journalist and politician Simon Casady, who in 1976, was the Democratic Party’s candidate of choice to run against Pete Wilson for the mayor of San Diego; his great-grandfather was the Episcopal Bishop Thomas Casady, who in 1947, founded the Casady School in Oklahoma City; his great-great-grandfather was the prominent Iowa banker Simon Casady, and his great-great-great-grandfather was the Iowa judge Phineas M. Casady.

Filmography
He was a producer in all films unless otherwise noted.

Film

Thanks

Television

Miscellaneous crew

References

External links
 

Year of birth missing (living people)
Living people
American people of Scotch-Irish descent
American talent agents
American television producers
American film producers
Casady family
University of Pennsylvania alumni